Mukhoty is a surname. Notable people with the surname include:
Ira Mukhoty, Indian author
Gobinda Mukhoty, co-author of Who Are The Guilty

Indian surnames